Expo Line may refer to:
 Expo Line (SkyTrain), a rapid transit line in Greater Vancouver, Canada
 E Line (Los Angeles Metro), a rapid transit line in Los Angeles County, California, United States
 Line 13, Shanghai Metro, a rapid transit line in Shanghai, China, also known as the "Expo Line"

See also
Expo Station (disambiguation)